Captain John Henry Watson was an Irish champion polo player. He won the International Polo Cup in Newport, Rhode Island in 1876 alongside Captain Thomas Hone, Malcolm Orme Little, and Captain the Hon. Richard Lawley, 4th Baron Wenlock.

References

International Polo Cup
Irish polo players
19th-century British people